Following are the results of the Men's 10 metre platform diving event at the 2009 World Aquatics Championships held in Rome, Italy, from July 17 to August 2, 2009.

Results

Green denotes finalists

External links
Preliminary Results
Semifinal Results
Final Results

Diving at the 2009 World Aquatics Championships